Cinquefoil or Potentilla is a genus containing over 300 species of flowering plants in the rose family.

Cinquefoil may also refer to:

 Comarum, a genus of plants formerly included with Potentilla
 Dasiphora, woody cinquefoils
 Drymocallis, a genus formerly included with Potentilla
 Sibbaldiopsis, three-toothed cinquefoil
 The cinquefoil knot, a knot whose outline resembles a cinquefoil flower
 A pattern in heraldry resembling a cinquefoil flower; see Charge (heraldry)#Plants

See also
 Foil (architecture)
 Quatrefoil
 Trefoil